Stulang (Jawi: ستولڠ) is a suburb in Johor Bahru, Johor, Malaysia. It is divided by two main roads, which are Jalan Stulang Darat and Jalan Stulang Laut. Previously it was a small fishing village facing toward Johor Straits. Nowadays it is full of low cost flats (housing), and a large private Chinese school (Foon Yew High School) is located here.

Zheng Ann Old Temple is a more than eighty years old temple in the area.

The royal place of Johor Sultan, Pasir Pelangi, is also located here.

Demographics

Most of Stulang's residents are of Chinese descent (51.5%), followed by Malays (43%) and Indians (4.6%).

Transportation
The area is accessible by Muafakat Bus route P-102.

References

Johor Bahru
Populated places in Johor